Building at 130–132 Biltmore Avenue is a historic residential building located at Asheville, Buncombe County, North Carolina. It is one of a row of granite apartment buildings on the lower end of Biltmore Avenue. It was built in 1905, and is a two-story, uncoursed rubble granite apartment building with a high, slate-shingled mansard roof in an English Queen Anne style.  It features three tall chimney stacks on either side elevation.

It was listed on the National Register of Historic Places in 1979.

References

Residential buildings on the National Register of Historic Places in North Carolina
Queen Anne architecture in North Carolina
Residential buildings completed in 1905
Buildings and structures in Asheville, North Carolina
National Register of Historic Places in Buncombe County, North Carolina
1905 establishments in North Carolina